Frederick or Frederic  Lord may refer to:
Frederick William Lord (1800–1860), American United States Representative from New York
Frederic Ives Lord (1897–1967), British pilot 
Frederic Lord (1886–1945), English choir director, teacher, organist, and composer
Frederick Lord (Queensland politician) (1841–1914), member of the Queensland Legislative Assembly
Frederick Lord (athlete) (1879–1928), British track and field athlete
Frederic M. Lord (1912–2000), psychometrician